Omar Benchiheb is a paralympic athlete from Algeria competing mainly in category T11 distance running events.

Omar competed in his first Paralympics in 2000 in the 1500m, 5000m and 10000m for T11, but it was at the 2008 Summer Paralympics where he won a bronze medal in the 1500m and competed in the 5000m.

References

Paralympic athletes of Algeria
Athletes (track and field) at the 2000 Summer Paralympics
Athletes (track and field) at the 2004 Summer Paralympics
Paralympic bronze medalists for Algeria
Living people
Medalists at the 2004 Summer Paralympics
Year of birth missing (living people)
Paralympic medalists in athletics (track and field)
21st-century Algerian people
Algerian male middle-distance runners
Algerian male long-distance runners
20th-century Algerian people
Visually impaired middle-distance runners
Visually impaired long-distance runners
Paralympic middle-distance runners
Paralympic long-distance runners